Grafton Historic District may refer to:

Grafton Historic District (Grafton, Illinois), listed on the National Register of Historic Places in Jersey County, Illinois
Grafton Historic District (Rockville, Utah), listed on the National Register of Historic Places in Washington County, Utah